NASTAR (an abbreviation for National Standard Race) is the world's largest recreational ski and snowboard race program. 
It was founded in 1968 by Ski magazine and is owned and operated by Outside Inc..

NASTAR has a scoring system for assigning scores to ski and snowboard racers of all ages and abilities, using a handicap system. Since the program's beginning in 1968, more than 6 million NASTAR racer days have been recorded. It has been  available at more than 100 ski resorts in North America and 1 in Australia. Many  U.S. Ski Team stars got their start ski racing in NASTAR programs.

History
NASTAR uses the principle of time percentages to calibrate a skier's ability, a concept pioneered by France's Ecole de Ski Nationale Chamois program. For certification, a ski instructor had to perform well enough in the Ecole's annual Challenge to earn a silver medal.. . be less than 25 percent behind the time recorded by the fastest instructor. The Chamois  was a regular slalom race course with hairpins and flushes. A certified instructor, back at his home area, could set the pace for local participants  in Chamois races. His time was not re-calibrated or speeded up, as in Nastar, by the amount he lagged behind the winning time in the annual Challenge. The Nastar idea of adjusting a local pacesetter's time to a national standard was introduced in France 20 years later, in the winter of 1987-88. SNMSF (Syndicat National des Moniteurs de Ski Francais) introduced Fleche, an open-gated giant slalom, during the same winter that Nastar began, though unknown to Nastar's founder. g.</ref> × Nastar the Beginning, by John Fry, NSAA Journal, January 2018.  Paul Chalvin, former Director of the SNMSF (Syndicat National des Moniteurs de Ski Francais)

John Fry, who became editor-in-chief of Ski magazine in 1964, adapted this percentage-of-time system to a program for recreational ski racing in the United States, calling it the 'National Standard Race'. Fry, who in 1969 became editorial director of Golf Magazine as well as SKI, was driven by the idea of creating in skiing the equivalent of par in golf. The program, to which Fry applied the acronym NASTAR, was introduced in 1968 as a means to compare the performance of recreational ski racers at resorts across the United States, and later, for a time, in Australia, Canada, Scandinavia, Switzerland and Italy. Nastar courses are simple, open-gated giant slaloms on mostly intermediate terrain, allowing skiers of all abilities and ages to experience racing.  Just as in golf's handicap system, skiers can compare their times and compete with one another regardless of where and when they compete. It takes into account varying terrain and snow conditions. The program started with 8 participating resorts and 2,297 skiers in the first year, but quickly gained in popularity, under the powerful direction of former U.S. Ski Team coach and pro skiing impresario Bob Beattie, growing to more than 100 resorts and 6 million skiers and snowboarders having participated by 2006.
The program went through several national sponsors, the latest being Nature Valley.

Handicap system

The National Standard is the Par Time or the "0" handicap which every racer competes against when they race NASTAR. The "0" handicap is typically set by a U.S. Ski Team racer or former champion. 
Runners-up  establish handicaps against the winner by their lag time percentage.  These 'traveling pacesetters'  compete against pacesetters from each NASTAR resort at sanctioned Regional Pacesetting Trials prior to the start of the following season. These events enable pacesetters from each individual resort to establish their own certified handicap against the national champion's Par Time or "0" handicap. The resort pacesetters use their certified handicap to set the Par Time at their local NASTAR course each racing day, and in turn give each participant who races at their resort a handicap that is referenced to the national champion. The Par Time is approximately the time the national NASTAR champion would have raced the course had he been there that day.
Various allowances are then made for age group, gender, disability if any, snowboarders, etc.
Every skier, regardless of ability or disability, can ski with a time referenced against the national champion, corrected for the specific resort and course conditions and his/her level. Platinum, Gold, Silver and Bronze designations are based on performance in several races, relative to each racer's age, gender and ability group. Championships are held near the end of the skiing season each year.

Standard NASTAR course
Participating NASTAR resorts are allowed some leeway in determining the location and set up of their NASTAR race venue but typically it is visible from a high traffic lift or lodge. The resort can decide whether to have single or dual courses. Each NASTAR course is essentially a modified Giant Slalom (GS) course with anywhere from 12 to 20 gates that racers must maneuver around. Gates are set with 18 to 20 meters distance between gates vertically and 4 to 8 meters of offset. Each resort is encouraged to standardize its course(s) to have a par time of 23 seconds and set courses so that no course is within 5% of the cap time. The "cap time" is the time it takes the local pacesetter to tuck from the start to the finish of their course without going around gates, and is the fastest possible time down the venue. 
The overall standardization allows the participants to compare race times wherever and whenever they race.

NASTAR database
NASTAR requires all participants to register. This is a free and easy process, which can be done online from home, via the NASTAR web site.
Once registered, each racer pays a small entry fee per race.
Races are timed electronically using a mechanical lever for the clock start and an optical beam sensor for the clock stop. The race results are saved on a computer and are uploaded by the resort to the central NASTAR database each race day. Once the data is on the central database (typically by the end of a racing day), it is publicly accessible and racers can easily view their  performance history from various dates and resorts at any time.

Resort participation
Every ski resort in North America is encouraged to participate in the NASTAR program. The NASTAR organization sends out presentations and questionnaires to all resorts in the off season, to determine the resorts eligible for participation during the coming season.
Participating resorts then receive a NASTAR kit and instructions that allow them to upload daily race data into the central NASTAR database. They also must have certified NASTAR pacesetters that can perform a pacesetting run on the designated course each racing day, to calibrate the handicap for the course conditions on that day.

National championship

Alpine Division skiers
Prior to the end of the season, the 3 top Alpine Division performers of each resort in each of the 4 medal divisions (Platinum, Gold, Silver and Bronze) are invited to compete in the National Championship. Those who choose to participate, compete against others in their respective category. Each racer is assigned a division in his or her appropriate gender and age group for the national race to 'level the playing field'. After the competition, for each gender and age group, the fastest 3 racers are awarded Gold, Silver and Bronze medals. Gold medal winners then compete in a final "Race of Champions" competition to determine the overall champion based on handicapped time, along with the fastest 3 racers based on 'raw' time.

Non-Alpine Division skiers
The non-Alpine Divisions (for the purposes of NASTAR championship racing classification) are Telemark, Physically Challenged, and Snowboarders. For each division, the top 100 performers during the season in their respective age and gender group are invited to compete in the National Championship. After the competition, Gold, Silver and Bronze medals are awarded for the fastest 3 racers by handicap in each division, gender and age group.

Participation
The National NASTAR Championship brings together over one thousand participants from the United States and Canada, of all ages and ability groups. The 2006 Championship was held in Steamboat Springs and included 1,337 racers of ages 3 to 86, from 44 U.S. states and Canada.

NASTAR as ski instructor qualification
Traditionally, ski instructor certification was based more on subjective assessment of form and technique rather than objective clock-based performance. Lately this has been changing, as a result of the wide availability and growing popularity of NASTAR.

On August 8, 2004, the Rocky Mountain Division of the Professional Ski Instructors of America (PSIA) voted to allow a NASTAR gold medal (equivalent to a racing time within 16% of the national U.S. champion for a male in his 20s) as one of the pre-requisites for future certification of a Level 3 Ski Instructor. The Rocky Mountain Division of the PSIA includes the biggest ski resorts in the U.S., such as Vail, Aspen, Steamboat and Taos and has 6,000 members, half of which are certified as Level 3, the highest rating for an instructor.

See also
 Alpine skiing
 Giant slalom skiing

Notes

Skiing in the United States
Alpine skiing in the United States
Snowboarding in the United States